Dunfermline Central is one of the 22 wards used to elect members of the Fife council. It elects four Councillors.

Councillors

Election Results

2022 Election
2022 Fife Council election

2019 By-election
In September 2019 Dunfermline Central Conservative Cllr Alan Craig resigned his seat. A by-election was held on 14 November 2019 and Derek Glen gained the seat for the SNP.

2017 Election
2017 Fife Council election

2012 Election
2012 Fife Council election

2007 Election
2007 Fife Council election

References

Wards of Fife
Politics of Dunfermline